Dalbergia emirnensis is a species of legume in the family Fabaceae.
It is found only in Madagascar.
It is threatened by habitat loss.

References

Sources

emirnensis
Endemic flora of Madagascar
Near threatened plants
Taxonomy articles created by Polbot